Simon Brindley Mason  (born 30 March 1973 in Harpenden, Hertfordshire) is a male former English field hockey goalkeeper.

Hockey career
Mason participated in three Summer Olympics for Great Britain: in 1996, 2000 and 2004. Mason, nicknamed Long Arm of the Law, played club hockey for Firebrands, Stroud, Reading, Guildford and Indian Gymkhana Hockey Club. He represented England and won a bronze medal, at the 1998 Commonwealth Games in Kuala Lumpur.

Personal life
He is a resident of Woking, and is co-owner and managing director of Mercian Sports Company a specialist field hockey equipment company. He was the President of the England Hockey Board (2010–2013), is a current member of the executive board for the European Hockey Federation and was on the Athlete Committees for both the International Hockey Federation and the Organising Committee for the London Olympic Games (2005 – 2012).

References

External links
 
 Profile on Athens 2004-site
 sports-reference

1973 births
Living people
English male field hockey players
Male field hockey goalkeepers
Olympic field hockey players of Great Britain
British male field hockey players
Field hockey players at the 1996 Summer Olympics
Field hockey players at the 2000 Summer Olympics
Field hockey players at the 2004 Summer Olympics
1998 Men's Hockey World Cup players
2002 Men's Hockey World Cup players
Commonwealth Games bronze medallists for England
People from Harpenden
People educated at Katharine Lady Berkeley's School
Commonwealth Games medallists in field hockey
Reading Hockey Club players
Guildford Hockey Club players
Field hockey players at the 1998 Commonwealth Games
Medallists at the 1998 Commonwealth Games